These are articles listing games previously released for the PlayStation 2 console that were later made available for download from the PlayStation Store for play on the PlayStation 3 and PlayStation 4. For lists of the games available by console, see:

List of PlayStation 2 Classics for PlayStation 3
List of PlayStation 2 games for PlayStation 4

1